Jesse C. Smith (June 18, 1808 Butternuts, Otsego County, New York - July 11, 1888 Brooklyn, Kings County, New York) was an American lawyer and politician from New York.

Life
He graduated from Union College in 1832. Then he studied law, was admitted to the bar, and commenced practice in Brooklyn. He was Surrogate of Kings County from 1850 to 1854. He was active in the State Militia, attaining the rank of colonel.

He was a member of the New York State Senate (2nd D.) in 1862 and 1863. Afterwards he joined the Union Army with the 139th New York Volunteer Infantry Regiment, and commanded as a brigadier general the 11th Brigade at the Battle of Gettysburg.

He "was stricken with paralysis," and died at his home at 143 Willow Street, in Brooklyn.

Sources
 The New York Civil List compiled by Franklin Benjamin Hough, Stephen C. Hutchins and Edgar Albert Werner (1870; pg. 443)
 Biographical Sketches of the State Officers and the Members of the Legislature of the State of New York in 1862 and '63 by William D. Murphy (1863; pg. 108f)
 OBITUARY; GEN. JESSE C. SMITH in NYT on July 12, 1888
 Historical Register and Dictionary of the United States Army by Francis Bernard Heitman (Vol. 1, pg. 900)

1808 births
1888 deaths
Republican Party New York (state) state senators
People from Butternuts, New York
People from Brooklyn Heights
Union Army generals
Union College (New York) alumni
New York (state) state court judges
19th-century American politicians
19th-century American judges